John R. Graham (26 April 1926 – September 2006) was an English professional footballer who played as a forward.

Career
Born in Leyland, Graham played for Leyland Works, Blackburn Rovers, Aston Villa, Wrexham, Rochdale and Bradford City.

For Bradford City he made 18 appearances in the Football League, scoring 1 goal; he also made 2 FA Cup appearances.

Sources

References

1926 births
2006 deaths
English footballers
Blackburn Rovers F.C. players
Aston Villa F.C. players
Wrexham A.F.C. players
Rochdale A.F.C. players
Bradford City A.F.C. players
English Football League players
Association football forwards